The 1965 South American Championships in Athletics  were held in Rio de Janeiro, Brazil, between 8 and 16 May. This was the last edition of the Championships in which Brazil did not top the medal table.

Medal summary

Men's events

Women's events

Medal table

External links
 Men Results – GBR Athletics
 Women Results – GBR Athletics
 Medallists

S
South American Championships in Athletics
A
1965 in South American sport
International athletics competitions hosted by Brazil
1965 in Brazilian sport
Athletics in Rio de Janeiro (city)